Stenocercus limitaris is a species of lizard of the Tropiduridae family. It is found in Ecuador and Peru.

References

Stenocercus
Reptiles described in 1998
Reptiles of Ecuador
Reptiles of Peru